Woodside Park is a suburban residential area in London, England.

Woodside Park may also refer to:

Woodside Park (Silver Spring, Maryland), a neighborhood of Silver Spring, Maryland, United States
Woodside Amusement Park, a former amusement park in Philadelphia, Pennsylvania, United States, constructed in 1897 and operated until 1955
Woodside Park tube station, the tube station for Woodside Park, England
Woodside Park (Wood Green, London), a park in Wood Green, north London, England